Adriapontia is a genus of flies in the family Sepsidae.

Species
Adriapontia aethiopica Ozerov, 2000
Adriapontia capensis (Hennig, 1960)
Adriapontia freidbergi Ozerov, 2000
Adriapontia ihongeroensis (Vanschuytbroeck, 1963)
Adriapontia kyanyamaensis (Vanschuytbroeck, 1963)
Adriapontia tanzanica Ozerov, 2000
Adriapontia ugandica Ozerov, 2000

References

Sepsidae
Diptera of Africa
Brachycera genera